APTN Mainstage is a half-hour Canadian musical television series showcasing First Nations music from across Canada and North America. It aired on APTN.

External links
 Digital Forum

1996 Canadian television series debuts
Aboriginal Peoples Television Network original programming
1990s Canadian variety television series
1990s Canadian music television series
First Nations music
First Nations television series